Danilo Timon Barthel (born 24 October 1991) is a German professional basketball player who last played for Fenerbahçe of the Turkish Basketball Super League (BSL) and the EuroLeague.

Professional career

Barthel began his professional career in his hometown with USC Heidelberg in 2008. On 23 June 2011 he signed with Fraport Skyliners.

In the 2013–14 season he played 34 league games for Frankfurt, averaging 11.3 points, 4.9 rebounds and 1.4 assists in 28.1 minutes per game. For the season, he was named the League's BBL Most Improved Player.

With Frankfurt he won the 2015–16 FIBA Europe Cup in a final against Openjobmetis Varese.

On 6 July 2016 he signed a two-year deal with Bayern Munich. On 17 June 2018 Barthel won his first BBL championship with Bayern after defeating Alba Berlin 3–2 in the finals. Barthel was named the Finals MVP after the decisive game five. Over five finals games, he averaged 12.8 points, 4.6 rebounds on 70.8% shooting from the field.

On 13 July 2020 Barthel signed his first contract outside of Germany, accepting an offer from top Turkish side Fenerbahçe Istanbul. On 20 June 2022 Barthel parted ways with the Turkish club.

International career
Barthel has been a member of the German national under-18 and German national under-20 teams. He played in the 2009 FIBA Europe Under-18 Championship and the 2010 and 2011 FIBA Europe Under-20 Championship and helped the German team to fifth place in 2011, averaging 4.9 points, 4.1 rebounds and 0.9 assists.

On 27 July 2014, he made his debut for the senior Germany national basketball team in a game against Finland. Barthel played with Germany at the 2020 Summer Olympics in Tokyo.

References

1991 births
Living people
2019 FIBA Basketball World Cup players
Basketball players at the 2020 Summer Olympics
Centers (basketball)
FC Bayern Munich basketball players
Fenerbahçe men's basketball players
German expatriate basketball people in Turkey
German men's basketball players
Olympic basketball players of Germany
Power forwards (basketball)
Skyliners Frankfurt players
Sportspeople from Heidelberg
USC Heidelberg players
21st-century German people